Calyciphora nephelodactyla is a plume moth of the family Pterophoridae.

Distribution
This species can be found in Spain, France, Switzerland, Italy, Austria, the Czech Republic, Slovakia, Poland, Hungary, Serbia and Montenegro, Bosnia and Herzegovina, Bulgaria, North Macedonia, Greece, Russia and Anatolia.

Description
The wingspan is 21–24 mm. The forewings are pale brownish-grey with dark grey markings. The hindwings are whitish. The larvae are pale greenish, covered with long white hairs.

Biology
Adults fly on July and August. Larvae feed on Cirsium eriophorum.

References

Pterophorini
Moths described in 1844
Moths of Asia
Plume moths of Europe
Taxa named by Eduard Friedrich Eversmann